Dindymon , was a mountain in eastern Phrygia (today's Murat Dağı of Gediz), later part of Galatia, that was later called Agdistis, sacred to the "mountain mother", Cybele, whom the Hellenes knew as Rhea. Strabo sited Dindymon above Pessinos, sacred to Cybele. It was an important location in Greek mythology.

A Mount Dindymon might also be placed on the peninsula of Cyzicus facing the Sea of Marmara, as in Apollonius of Rhodes' Argonautica, or by Stephanus Byzantinicus further south, in the Troad, thus near Mount Ida. Argonautica book I sets a scene at Mount Dindymon, where Jason placates the goddess of the mountain, "the mother of all the blessed gods, where she sits enthroned". identified as "Dindymene [Δινδυμηνή] the mother, Lady of many names," among which was Rhea.

The various applications of Dindymon, as the mountain of the Anatolian Mother Goddess, the "Mountain Mother", is explained by Robinson Ellis: "The name Dindymenian mother would in the first instance no doubt be connected with the earliest seat of the worship, the Phrygian Dindymon, but as soon as the worship spread farther and the name of Dindymon with it, the Goddess of Dindymon would lose its original definiteness and be variously applied by different writers."

Notes

Ancient Greek geography
Greek mythology of Anatolia
Geography of ancient Anatolia
Phrygia
Cybele
Locations in Greek mythology
Mountains of Turkey